Vikhammer Station is a railway station located in the village of Vikhammer in the municipality of Malvik in Trøndelag county, Norway.

The station is on the Nordland Line. The station is served hourly by the Trøndelag Commuter Rail service between Steinkjer Station and Trondheim Central Station. The unstaffed station is operated by SJ Norge.

History
The station was built as part of the Meråker Line in 1893. The station was closed from 1985 until the mid-1990s when it was opened once again. The name was originally Vikhammer, but from 1926 it was changed to Vikhamar.  In 2007, the name was switched back to Vikhammer.

References

Malvik
Railway stations in Trøndelag
Railway stations on the Nordland Line
Railway stations opened in 1893
1893 establishments in Norway